Dr Hormasji Dorabji Kanga also known as HD Kanga (9 April 1880 – 29 December 1945) was an Indian cricketer who played first-class cricket for the Parsis (sometimes spelt Parsees) cricket team between 1899 and 1921 as an all-rounder and opening batsman. He was the first Indian to score a double century in a first-class match, and the Kanga Cricket League is named after him. His older twin brothers Dinshaw and MD also played first-class cricket for Parsees.

Career
In his cricketing career, Kanga played 43 first-class matches between 1899 and 1921. In a match between Parsis and a Europeans cricket team at the Deccan Gymkhana Ground, Kanga scored his career best score of 233. In doing so, he became the first Indian to score a double century in a first-class match. In 1911, Kanga was part of the All Indian team that toured the British Isles; the team played a number of county cricket and other first-class teams. Kanga also played for the Hampstead Cricket Club in England.

After his retirement, Kanga was the President of the Bombay Cricket Association 1930–31 and 1934–35, and was also vice-president of the Board of Control for Cricket in India from 1936 until his death in 1945.

Legacy
In 1948, three years after his death, the Bombay Cricket Association created the Kanga Cricket League, a monsoon season cricket tournament that they named after Hormasji Kanga.

References

External links

Indian cricketers
Cricketers from Mumbai
1880 births
1945 deaths
Indian cricket administrators
Parsi people from Mumbai
H. D. G. Leveson Gower's XI cricketers
Parsees cricketers
Lord Willingdon's XI cricketers
Members of the first Indian cricket team to tour England in 1911
Sportspeople from British India